Nelson Enrique Rivas López (born 25 March 1983) is a Colombian football defender. Rivas has not played for a professional team since 2015.

Career

Rivas began his career with Deportivo Pasto. After playing for several clubs in his native Colombia, Rivas became a fixture for Deportivo Cali.  He was a two-time winner of the Copa Mustang in Colombia, first with Deportes Tolima in 2003 and for the second time with Deportivo Cali in 2005. After leaving Cali he played for legendary club River Plate in Argentina.

Rivas was bought in July 2007 by Internazionale for €5 million and signed a contract until 30 June 2011. The transfer fee actually paid via FC Locarno in order to redistributed to investor. He made his debut in a Champions League game Fenerbahçe-Inter (1-0). On 23 September 2007 it was reported in Italy that Rivas had collapsed at the Saturday training session the previous day. He went to further examinations throughout the week after the incident. On 4 October 2008 he injured his knee in the Serie A game against Bologna. While with Inter he became a Serie A champion, having won it in the 2007–2008 season and 2008-2009.

He was loaned to A.S. Livorno Calcio during the 2009–2010 season where he played a total of 16 games, scoring two goals.
On 31 August 2011 the Colombian stopper became a free agent after his contract at Inter was rescinded by mutual consent.

On 2 October 2011 Nelson Rivas signed with Montreal Impact of Major League Soccer.

On 4 August 2012, at the 67th minute during a match between Montreal vs Philadelphia, Rivas was thrown to the ground by Antoine Hoppenot, prompting Rivas to headbutt Hoppenot.  A dispute between the two teams followed, with both Rivas and Philadelphia's Jack McInerney being sent off with red cards. Upon league review, Rivas received a three-game suspension.

Honours
Deportes Tolima
 Copa Mustang: 2003

Deportivo Cali
 Copa Mustang: 2005

Inter
 Serie A: 2008, 2009
 Supercoppa Italiana: 2008, 2010

Montreal Impact
 Canadian Championship: 2013, 2014

References

External links
 

1983 births
Living people
Colombian footballers
Colombian expatriate footballers
Expatriate footballers in Argentina
Expatriate footballers in Italy
Expatriate footballers in Ukraine
Colombian expatriate sportspeople in Ukraine
Expatriate soccer players in Canada
Association football defenders
Deportivo Pasto footballers
Deportivo Cali footballers
Deportes Tolima footballers
Club Atlético River Plate footballers
Inter Milan players
Bologna F.C. 1909 players
U.S. Livorno 1915 players
CF Montréal players
FC Dnipro players
Atlético F.C. footballers
Serie A players
Ukrainian Premier League players
Major League Soccer players
Argentine Primera División players
Categoría Primera A players
Sportspeople from Valle del Cauca Department